John Hennessey-Niland is an American diplomat who has served as the United States Ambassador to Palau since March 6, 2020.

Early life and education 

Hennessey-Niland received his Bachelor of Arts at Tufts University, a Master of Arts in Law and Diplomacy at the Fletcher School of Law and Diplomacy, and a Diplome at France's École nationale d'administration.

Career 

Previously he was the Foreign Policy Advisor to United States Marine Corps Forces Pacific at Camp H. M. Smith, Hawaii, and the Political-Economic Chief at the United States Embassy in Suva, Fiji.  Other diplomatic assignments include Deputy Chief of Mission and later Chargé d’Affaires at the Embassy of the United States, Dublin, Ireland; Director at the National Security Council for the G-20/G-7; and Director of International Narcotics and Law Enforcement at the Embassy of the United States,  Islamabad, Pakistan.

On September 30, 2019, President Trump nominated Hennessey-Niland to be the next United States Ambasassador to Palau. On February 11, 2020, his nomination was confirmed in the United States Senate by voice vote. He presented his credentials on March 6, 2020.

In March 2021, Hennessey-Niland traveled to Taiwan, alongside Palauan President Surangel Whipps Jr., who met with President Tsai Ing-wen. This made Hennessey-Niland the first sitting U.S. ambassador to visit Taiwan since the U.S. broke off formal diplomatic relations with Taiwan in 1979.

Personal life 
Hennessey-Niland speaks French and Dutch.

Awards 

Hennessey-Niland has received the Department of State Foreign Policy Advisors of the Year Award and the Navy Meritorious Civilian Service Medal.

See also
List of ambassadors of the United States
List of ambassadors appointed by Donald Trump

References

Year of birth missing (living people)
Place of birth missing (living people)
Living people
21st-century American diplomats
École nationale d'administration alumni
The Fletcher School at Tufts University alumni
United States Foreign Service personnel
Ambassadors of the United States to Palau